Obsession is an album by Bob James. It was James's first solo album for Warner Bros. Records after around a decade with CBS.

Review
On AllMusic, Jason Elias wrote: "Obsession displays the often chilly sounds of period synthesizers. The only vocal track, 'Gone Hollywood', co-written by Lenny White, has good keyboard textures and plaintive vocals from Lisa Fischer and blistering guitar solos from Steve Khan. [...] While many might be put off by the pure 1980s production values of '3AM' and 'Rousseau', luckily, they have compelling arrangements to ward off boredom. The album's best song, 'Rain', is a methodical and pretty track that is an essential for devotees of the often-maligned late-1980s jazz-pop era. Obsession certainly works better than 12 and is a suitable continuation of the style of early-'80s albums The Genie and Sign of the Times.

Track listing
"Obsession" (Micheal Colina, Bob James) - 6:04
"Gone Hollywood" (Alan Palanker, Vaneese Thomas, Lenny White) - 6:11
"3 A.M." (Lenny White, Bernard Wright) - 5:24
"Rousseau" (Micheal Colina) - 6:01
"Rain" (Bob James) - 6:53
"Steady" (Bob James) - 5:41
"Feel the Fire" (Gary King) - 4:32

Personnel 
 Bob James – keyboards, computer programming 
 Michael Colina – computer programming, drum programming 
 Steve Khan – guitar, guitar solo (2)
 Nick Moroch – guitar, guitar solo (3)
 Marcus Miller – bass guitar
 Ray Bardani – drum programming 
 Lenny White – drum programming (2)
 Michael Brecker – saxophone, EWI solo (4)
 Andy Snitzer – saxophone
 Kirk Whalum – saxophone, sax solo (6)
 Randy Brecker – trumpet
 Jon Faddis – trumpet
 Sharon Bryant – vocals
 Renee Diggs – vocals
 Lisa Fischer – vocals, lead vocals (2)
 Vaneese Thomas – vocals

Production 
 Bob James – producer 
 Michael Colina – producer 
 Ray Bardani – producer, engineer, mixing 
 George Marino – mastering 
 Janet Levinson – art direction, design
 James Endicott – illustration 
 John Russell – photography

Studios
 Recorded at Minot Sound (White Plains, New York) and Remedi Sound (Ardsley-On-Hudson, New York).
 Mixed at Minot Sound
 Mastered at Sterling Sound (New York City, New York).

References

1986 albums
Bob James (musician) albums
Albums produced by Bob James (musician)
Albums produced by Michael Colina
Warner Records albums